Ashok Banerjee is a professor of finance at Indian Institute of Management Calcutta.

Banerjee holds an M.Com. degree from Calcutta University and a Ph.D. from Rajasthan University. At IIM Calcutta, he is a senior Professor in the Finance and Control group, and takes several advanced courses in Finance like Financial Accountancy, Corporate Finance, Corporate Restructuring and Behavioural Finance. He is also the faculty in-charge of the Finance Research and Trading Lab at IIM-C.

Banerjee's primary research interests are in areas of Financial Time Series and Operational Risk Management.

Selected bibliography
 Banerjee A: Financial Accounting: A Managerial Emphasis 
 Banerjee A: Real Option Valuation of a Pharmaceutical Company, Vikalpa (2003, Vol 28, No. 2, April–June 2003, pages 61–73).
 Banerjee A & Bhattacharyya, M: Integration of Global Capital Markets: An Empirical Exploration, International Journal of Theoretical and Applied Finance (2004, VOL 7; PART 4, pages 385–406).
 Banerjee A, Chakrabarti B B & Deb S: Value Premium in Indian Equity Market: an Empirical Evidence, ICFAI Journal of Applied Finance (December 2006, Vol. 12, No. 12, pages 41–60).

References

External links
 Indian Institute of Management Calcutta - Faculty Information
 Indian Institute of Management Calcutta - Finance and Control Group Faculty
 Indian Institute of Management Calcutta
 https://www.iimcal.ac.in/users/ashok

Academic staff of the Indian Institute of Management Calcutta
Living people
University of Calcutta alumni
Year of birth missing (living people)